Catherine Elizabeth Newman (born 14 July 1974) is an English journalist, and presenter of Channel 4 News. She began her career as a newspaper journalist, and had spells at Media Week, The Independent, the Financial Times and The Washington Post. She has worked on Channel 4 News since 2006, initially as a correspondent and, since 2011, as a presenter.

In 2018, she released Bloody Brilliant Women: The Pioneers, Revolutionaries and Geniuses Your History Teacher Forgot to Mention, a book detailing the lives of women in Britain in the 20th and 21st centuries. In 2020, she released It Takes Two: A History of the Couples Who Dared to be Different, a book about how great pairs, from romantic couples to sworn rivals, have made history.

Early life
Born in Guildford, Surrey, Newman is the younger daughter of David Newman and Julia Worsdall, both chemistry teachers, and has one sister. She attended a fee-paying girls school in Guildford until the age of 16, when she joined Charterhouse, where her father taught, as one of a few girls admitted to the school's sixth form. She has said that she stayed silent for years about the sexual harassment and other humiliation she experienced from fellow pupils. She was on the path to a career as a violinist or in the legal profession before changing her plans as a result of seeing BBC journalist Kate Adie on television. Newman read English at Lady Margaret Hall, Oxford, where she graduated with first-class honours.

Career

Early career
Following university, Newman briefly worked on The Guardians Books section, then at Media Week (as a trainee) and The Independent (as media business correspondent) before joining the Financial Times (FT) at the age of 23. Her older colleague Alice Rawsthorn acted as a mentor at the FT, where Newman worked as a media and then (for three years) political correspondent. While Newman was working at the FT, David Yelland, the editor of The Sun, offered her a slot called "Better than Lex" (named after Lex, a column in the Financial Times). She seriously considered the offer, but later declined; the experience led to further opportunities in political journalism. Newman began a television career in 2000. She gained a Laurence Stern fellowship to work at The Washington Post for four months. During her period in the US, she followed the 2000 Presidential campaign of Green Party candidate Ralph Nader.

Channel 4 News
She joined Channel 4 News in January 2006 as a political correspondent and deputy to political editor Gary Gibbon. She asked Peter Mandelson at the Brighton Labour Party conference in 2009, whether he had used the "c" word in a conversation with Rebekah Brooks, the CEO of News International.

From 2013 to 2015, Newman's pursuit of a story about the allegations of improper conduct levelled at Lord Rennard, once a leading figure in the Liberal Democrats, included her participation in an LBC local London radio phone-in on 27 February 2013 to quiz deputy Prime Minister Nick Clegg on the issue. Newman has commented that sexism was endemic at Westminster during her period as a lobby correspondent there, but has also said that the newspaper industry is even worse. She told Natasha Lunn in an interview for Red magazine in 2016: "As a woman in the media I feel a duty to make sure we report those issues. I've always wanted to right injustices; I suppose what's changed is I've now got a keener sense of how journalists can hold power to account". The victim of online sexism for her work, Newman gave her support for "public humiliation" of trolls in 2013: "the best way to tackle these people is to publicly humiliate them".

A regular commentator on politics in other media outlets, Newman has appeared as a guest panellist on Have I Got News for You and blogs for The Daily Telegraph and Economia magazine.

Newman was long-listed for the Orwell Prize (Journalism) in 2010 and again in 2011 for the Blog Prize. She was announced as one of the judges for the Baileys Women's Prize for Fiction in 2015.

In February 2015, Newman tweeted that she was "ushered onto the street" for being female when she went to the South London Islamic Centre for a "Visit My Mosque" programme. The mosque started receiving violent threats from the public as the story spread. A spokesperson for the Hyderi Islamic Centre had said Newman had simply visited the wrong address, and CCTV footage showed Newman had left the building of her own accord. Newman and Channel 4 News editor Ben de Pear later apologised, acknowledging that Newman had mistakenly visited the wrong building.

On 8 September 2022, she interrupted Channel 4's scheduled programme to announce the death of Queen Elizabeth II, following an announcement from Buckingham Palace earlier in the day.

Jordan Peterson interview
On 16 January 2018, Newman interviewed Canadian psychologist and author Jordan Peterson. The interview covered topics such as gender equality, including the gender pay gap, freedom of speech, and transgender rights. Short clips, gifs and memes of the fiery back-and-forth subsequently went viral, especially Newman's repeated use of the line "So you're saying..." —an utterance made 35 times during the 29-minute interview.

Many YouTube commenters were critical of Newman, a large number of them saying she had "a preconceived and misplaced grasp of Peterson's views", wrote Jamie Doward of The Guardian. New York Times columnist David Brooks criticized Newman for not listening to Peterson and for "distort[ing], simplif[ying] and restat[ing] his views to make them appear offensive and cartoonish".

Channel 4 News editor Ben de Pear said that the station called in security specialists in response to social media abuse and threats directed against her. Newman later said that "there were literally thousands of abusive tweets – it was a semi-organised campaign. It ranged from the usual 'cunt, bitch, dumb blonde' to 'I'm going to find out where you live and execute you'."
On Twitter, Peterson said there was "no evidence that the criticisms constituted threats", and that the idea the abuse was driven by misogyny was "ridiculous". Following the interview, Newman's Wikipedia article was "rapidly edited back and forth" for several weeks. Newman said that women generally are misrepresented in their Wikipedia biographies because the "internet is being written by men with an agenda."

Author
Newman's book, Bloody Brilliant Women, concerning significant, but unheralded, 20th-century women, was published in 2018. The book presents case studies of both prominent and lesser known women throughout British history, finding parallels between their experiences and those of contemporary women.

Times Radio 
In early 2020, Newman was announced by forthcoming radio station Times Radio as the presenter of their Friday drive time programme. She continues to present Channel 4 News while being a Times Radio presenter.

Conor Burns: "Ambushed with a cake" 
On 25 January 2022, Newman interviewed Conor Burns, minister of state for Northern Ireland, on Channel 4 News about the imminent publication of Sue Gray's report into alleged parties at 10 Downing Street in violation of COVID-19 lockdowns. Burns attempted to defend Prime Minister Boris Johnson by insisting that one party to celebrate Johnson's birthday "was not a premeditated, organised party. He was, in a sense, ambushed with a cake". The interview quickly went viral, inspiring thousands of social media memes, and Burns was widely mocked. The food writer Nigella Lawson joked on Twitter that she intended to use the phrase as the title for her next book. On 1 February 2022, White House press secretary Jen Psaki was asked at her daily press briefing if President Joe Biden had ever been ambushed with a cake. She replied: "Not that I'm aware of."

Personal life
Newman married writer John O'Connell, whom she met at university, in 2001. The couple live in London with their two daughters. Newman has written about having a miscarriage, and about deciding to have an abortion, after discovering 13 weeks into her pregnancy that the foetus had a rare condition with a high mortality rate.

Publications 
 
 It Takes Two. William Collins, 2020. ISBN 978-0-00-836333-8.

References

External links

 
 Cathy Newman on Twitter
 Cathy Newman's profile and archive on the Channel 4 News web site
 

1974 births
Living people
20th-century British journalists
20th-century English women writers
20th-century English writers
21st-century British journalists
21st-century English women writers
Alumni of Lady Margaret Hall, Oxford
Channel 4 people
English journalists
ITN newsreaders and journalists
People educated at Charterhouse School
People from Guildford
The Independent people
The Washington Post people